Todd Mitchell Feldman (born August 7, 1962) is a former American football wide receiver who played for the Miami Dolphins. He was a replacement player.

References

External links
 Todd Feldman College Stats

Living people
Miami Dolphins players
American football wide receivers
Kent State Golden Flashes football players
1962 births
National Football League replacement players